Ernest DiGregorio (born January 15, 1951), also known as "Ernie D.", is an American former professional basketball player. He was named NBA Rookie of the Year in the 1973–74 season and shares the NBA rookie record for assists in a single game with 25. Due to a severe knee injury suffered early in DiGregorio's professional career, he played only five NBA seasons.

A 1973 NCAA All-American at Providence, DiGregorio was inducted into the College Basketball Hall of Fame in 2019.

Early life
DiGregorio played on the 1968 Rhode Island (Class B) champions at North Providence High School.

College and NBA career 
He and Marvin Barnes led Coach Dave Gavitt's Providence team to a Final Four appearance in the 1973 NCAA Tournament in DiGregorio's senior season, where they eventually lost to Memphis State, but only after Barnes sustained a knee injury that forced an early exit. After playing for the Providence College Friars, DiGregorio played on a college all-star team, and along with Bill Walton, led the U.S. in defeating a Soviet team in an exhibition game, which helped heal the still-open wound of the United States' loss in the 1972 Summer Olympic finals.

Buffalo Braves (1973–1977) 
Ernie "D" was drafted by the Kentucky Colonels of the American Basketball Association but opted instead for the NBA.

He was selected third overall by the Buffalo Braves in the 1973 NBA draft out of Providence College, and won the NBA Rookie of the Year Award in 1973–74 after averaging 15.2 points and leading the league in both free throw percentage and assists per game. DiGregorio still holds the NBA rookie record for assists in a single game with 25 (a record now shared with Nate McMillan). He would never again come close to that level of production, but managed to have a decent NBA career, most of which he spent with the Braves.

During the 1976–77 season, DiGregorio led the league in free throw percentage a second time, with a then-NBA record 94.5%. In 1977, he joined fellow NBA stars Julius Erving, Rick Barry, Wilt Chamberlain, and Pete Maravich, in endorsing Spalding's line of rubber basketballs, with a signature "Ernie D." ball making up part of the collection.

Los Angeles Lakers (1977–1978) 
Before the 1977–78 season, DiGregorio was traded to the Los Angeles Lakers, and played in a Lakers' uniform in only 25 games before being waived.

Boston Celtics (1978) 
The Boston Celtics signed him as a free agent but he played only sparingly for the rest of the season. He would not play in the NBA again, although he did not formally retire until 1981.

Honors
 In 1999, DiGregorio was elected to the National Italian American Sports Hall of Fame.
 DiGregorio was inducted into the College Basketball Hall of Fame in 2019.

NBA career statistics

Regular season

|-
| style="text-align:left;"|
| style="text-align:left;"|Buffalo
| 81 ||  || 35.9 || .421 ||  ||style="background:#cfecec;"|.902* || 2.7 ||style="background:#cfecec;"| 8.2* || 0.7 || 0.1 || 15.2
|-
| style="text-align:left;"|
| style="text-align:left;"|Buffalo
| 31 ||  || 23.0 || .440 ||  || .778 || 1.5 || 4.9 || 0.6 || 0.0 || 7.8
|-
| style="text-align:left;"|
| style="text-align:left;"|Buffalo
| 67 ||  || 20.4 || .384 ||  || .915 || 1.7 || 4.0 || 0.6 || 0.0 || 6.7
|-
| style="text-align:left;"|
| style="text-align:left;"|Buffalo
| 81 ||  || 28.0 || .417 ||  ||style="background:#cfecec;"|.945* || 2.3 || 4.7 || 0.7 || 0.0 || 10.7
|-
| style="text-align:left;"|
| style="text-align:left;"|L.A. Lakers
| 25 ||  || 13.3 || .410 ||  || .800 || 0.9 || 2.8 || 0.2 || 0.0 || 3.9
|-
| style="text-align:left;"|
| style="text-align:left;"|Boston
| 27 ||  || 10.1 || .431 ||  || .923 || 1.0 || 2.4 || 0.4 || 0.0 || 3.9
|- class="sortbottom"
| style="text-align:center;" colspan="2"|Career
| 312 ||  || 25.2 || .415 ||  || .902 || 2.0 || 5.1 || 0.6 || 0.0 || 9.6

Playoffs

|-
| style="text-align:left;"|1974
| style="text-align:left;”|Buffalo
| 6 ||  || 40.0 || .430 ||  || .889 || 2.7 || 8.7 || 0.2 || 0.0 || 13.7
|-
| style="text-align:left;"|1976
| style="text-align:left;”|Buffalo
| 9 ||  || 24.1 || .484 ||  || 1.000 || 1.4 || 5.0 || 0.6 || 0.2 || 7.6
|- class="sortbottom"
| style="text-align:center;" colspan="2"|Career
| 15 ||  || 30.5 || .453 ||  || .941 || 1.9 || 6.5 || 0.4 || 0.1 || 10.0

College statistics

|-
| style="text-align:left;"| 1970–71
| style="text-align:left;"| Providence
| 28 ||  || 36.2 || .481 ||  || .830 || 4.0 || 6.5 ||  ||  || 18.6
|-
| style="text-align:left;"| 1971–72
| style="text-align:left;"| Providence
| 27 ||  || 38.0 || .436 ||  || .802 || 3.0 || 7.9 ||  ||  || 17.7
|-
| style="text-align:left;"| 1972–73
| style="text-align:left;"| Providence
| 31 ||  || 36.0 || .478 ||  || .802 || 3.2 || 8.6 ||  ||  || 24.5
|- class=sortbottom
| style="text-align:center;" colspan=2|Career
| 86 ||  || 36.7 || .468 ||  || .812 || 3.4 || 7.7 ||  ||  || 20.5
|-

See also
 List of National Basketball Association players with most assists in a game

References

External links

1951 births
Living people
All-American college men's basketball players
American men's basketball players
American people of Italian descent
Basketball players from Rhode Island
Boston Celtics players
Buffalo Braves draft picks
Buffalo Braves players
Kentucky Colonels draft picks
Los Angeles Lakers players
People from North Providence, Rhode Island
Point guards
Providence Friars men's basketball players